Gershayim (with variant English spellings) is a cantillation mark that is found in the Torah, Haftarah, and other books of the Hebrew Bible. 

The Hebrew word  translates into English as double geresh.

Total occurrences

References

Cantillation marks